John Newcombe and Tom Okker were the defending champions but both players chose not to participate.

Dick Crealy and Onny Parun won in the final 6–3, 6–2, 3–6, 5–7, 6–1 against Bob Lutz and Stan Smith.

Seeds

Draw

Finals

Top half

Section 1

Section 2

Bottom half

Section 3

Section 4

References

External links
1974 French Open – Men's draws and results at the International Tennis Federation

Men's Doubles
French Open by year – Men's doubles